Tony de Groot (born 24 March 1988) is a Dutch footballer who plays as a striker for Derde Divisie club Oss '20.

Career
Born in Oss, De Groot began playing football at the age of five at Oss '20. At under-12 level, he was scouted by neighbor club TOP Oss after scoring many goals in the youth academy. De Groot made his debut in professional football on 30 September 2007 for TOP Oss against SC Cambuur in the second-tier Eerste Divisie, scoring on his first touch as a substitute.

After leaving TOP Oss in 2009, De Groot played for lower league sides De Treffers and OJC Rosmalen before signing with hometown side Oss '20 in 2013. He was voted Player of the Year of the Derde Divisie in 2019. He had a title push with Oss' 20 in the 2019–20 season, but when the season was abandoned due to the COVID-19 pandemic, the club missed promotion to the third-tier Tweede Divisie despite leading the league by 25 points down to second placed Jong ADO Den Haag.

References

External links
 

1988 births
Living people
Sportspeople from Oss
Association football forwards
Dutch footballers
TOP Oss players
Eerste Divisie players
Vierde Divisie players
Derde Divisie players
OJC Rosmalen players
De Treffers players
Footballers from North Brabant
21st-century Dutch people